Argazi Reservoir is a reservoir, created on the Miass River (Tobol's basin) in Chelyabinsk Oblast (Russia) in 1946. The Argazi Lake has become a part of the Argazi Reservoir ever since. The reservoir has a surface area of 102 km² and a water volume of 0,65 cubic km. Its length is 11 km, average depth - 6,5 m. The Argazi Reservoir was created for the benefit of energetics and water supply. It also performs perennial flow regulation.

Name
Argazi Reservoir name is taken from the Bashkirs, the indigenous inhabitants of these places.

Reservoir in culture 
There is Bashkir folk song about Argazi lake   later became a reservoir.

References

Reservoirs in Russia
Reservoirs in Chelyabinsk Oblast